Stalingrad is a 2013 Russian war film directed by Fedor Bondarchuk. It was the first Russian movie released in IMAX. The film was released in September 2013 in Volgograd (formerly Stalingrad) and October in Russia before its international release in subsequent months (all releases were handled by the foreign-language arm of Columbia Pictures). The film was selected as the Russian entry for the Best Foreign Language Film at the 86th Academy Awards, but it was not nominated. Stalingrad received the I3DS (International 3D and Advanced Imaging Society) Jury Award for Russia in 2014.

The film is a love story set in November 1942 during the Battle of Stalingrad, three months into the six month battle that caused nearly 2,000,000 total casualties (wounded, killed, captured) for the two opponents, including tens of thousands of Russian civilians.  The story follows soldiers from both sides as they fight to survive while saving the lives of their loves, and struggle with retaining their humanity in the face of certain death and the unspeakable horrors of war. The plot seems to be somewhat influenced by Chapter 57 of Life And Fate, by writer and journalist Vasily Grossman, and therefore does have a literary antecedent.

Plot
The film opens in Japan in the wake of the 2011 Tōhoku earthquake and tsunami.  As emergency personnel work to reach some victims trapped underground, one rescuer tries to keep the victims calm by telling the story of how he came to have five fathers, all killed during the Great Patriotic War (World War II).  The trapped victims are young German students and the rescuers are Russian.

In 1942, after the initial attack on Stalingrad, a small group of Russian soldiers take cover in a large five story residential building that happens to provide cover for a Russian crossing point on the Volga River. Five of these soldiers become the five fathers in the story: Polyakov ("Angel") who had become embittered when his wife and daughter were killed in an air raid; Chvanov, whose hatred of the Germans comes from their cruel treatment and methodical murder of his family; Nikiforov, a talented tenor singer before the war, who had become a cruel and vicious fighter; Sergey, drafted into the war as a spotter; and Captain Gromov, a veteran and hero who leads the group after finding them.  The soldiers encounter a young girl named Katya, living alone in the building after her family had been killed. As they spend the next few days together, the soldiers grow fond of her, and she of them.

Germans encamped near the crossing are led by Hauptmann Kahn; a highly decorated, but disillusioned soldier who falls in love with a Russian woman named Masha, who resembles his late wife. She at first detests him, but soon begins to reciprocate his love, although they cannot speak each other's language. Oberstleutnant Henze arrives to take command of the Germans. He chides Kahn both for his attraction to Masha, as well as his failure to eradicate the Russian soldiers. Henze decides to set an example by rounding up the Russian civilians living in the bombed out buildings, then burning a woman and her daughter alive. This enrages the Russian soldiers who ambush the Germans, killing several, but losing several of their own men in the process. The Germans and Russians then retreat to their own shelters to wait the others out. One afternoon, Chvanov teaches Katya how to aim her gun at a German washing himself at a water faucet and startled, accidentally shoots him, which causes retaliation that injures Chvanov.

During one of his visits to Masha, Kahn promises to take her to safety when the time comes. On her 19th birthday, Katya is presented with a handmade cake from the soldiers, with a song by Nikiforov, whom she had earlier recognized as a famous singer. She is then given the gift of a bathtub filled with hot water, a luxury no one has experienced since the siege began.  Sergey takes Katya to his old lookout spot, located in a building not occupied by either the Germans or the Russians.  The two spend the night together, creating the narrator of our story.

After Polyakov ricocheted an artillery shell into the German complex, Kahn is ordered to begin the attack on them; he takes Masha to an abandoned building, hoping to save her from the coming fight. As she begs him to stay with her, she is shot by Chvanov for being a collaborator, enraging Kahn. Nikiforov is taken captive by the Germans, where he manages to brutally stab Henze before being killed himself. Henze's death puts Kahn back in charge.

German reinforcements arrive with tanks that have the range to take out the Russian soldiers and their building. They open fire, fatally injuring Chvanov. Kahn and his soldiers attack, shooting Polyakov to death. Kahn then finds Gromov on the second floor trying to use a radio. The two of them shoot each other several times before collapsing. Sergey reaches them and uses the radio to order an air strike on their building, which is being overrun by German soldiers. Katya watches with a broken heart as the building is leveled, leaving no one inside alive.

Back in the present day, the Germans are freed from the building. The girl to whom Sergey (who had been named after his biological father) had told his story seeks him out, and they share a moment of understanding before he is driven away.

Cast
 Pyotr Fyodorov as Capt. Gromov
 Dmitriy Lysenkov as Sgt. Chavanov
 Alexey Barabash as Nikiforov
 Andrey Smolyakov as Polyakov
 Sergey Bondarchuk Jr. as Junior Lt. Sergey Astakhov
 Oleg Volku as petty officer Krasnov
 Philippe Reinhardt as Gottfried
 Georges Devdariani as Klose
 Yanina Studilina as Masha
 Maria Smolnikova as Katya
 Thomas Kretschmann as Hauptmann Peter Kahn
 Heiner Lauterbach as Oberstleutnant Henze
 Polina Raikina as Natashka
 Yuriy Nazarov as Navodchik
 Daniel Moorehead as Sergey

Background
The original script by Ilya Tilkin does not have any literary source. The screenwriter studied diaries of the participants of the Battle of Stalingrad. He also used museum archives, documents and recorded stories of its participants.

The prototype of this house is the legendary Pavlov's House in Stalingrad. On the eve of filming, the script was significantly rewritten by the director and screenwriter Sergey Snezhkin.

Production
The first part of filming took place in autumn 2011 and lasted 17 days. During that time, two key episodes of the battle were shot, in which 900 extras and historical reenactors took part in crowd scenes. The main shooting process began at the end of May 2012 and ran until 27 July 2012.

Colossal scenery was constructed especially for Stalingrad filming at the former factory "Krasny Treugolnik" in St. Petersburg, and the Third North Fort near Kronstadt. Every detail for the movie sets depicting the centre of Stalingrad and the east bank of the Volga were faithfully and painstakingly reproduced, reflecting the vast scale of the battle. The budget for its construction was more than 120 million rubles (US$3.5 million), and it took over 400 people working for 6 months to build. Unusually though, for all the attention to detail the film-makers took, the Panzers reproduced for a major scene late in the film were modeled on a much different later type of the German Mk.IV that did not enter service until around a year after the battle (the Mk.IV G/H)- a major oversight by the historical advisors and production team.

The film was produced in 3D using equipment provided by a Hollywood company, 3ality Technica. It was released in 3D, IMAX 3D, and 2D.

For the reason that I continue to work on this project, I read all the history of the Battle of Stalingrad. From "Stalingrad" by Antony Beevor and "In the Trenches of Stalingrad" by Nekrasov to "Iron Cross" by Wilhelm Heinrich and "Life and Fate" by Vasily Grossman.
– Fedor Bondarchuk, the director of Stalingrad

It is planned that all German speech will not be dubbed into Russian in favour of subtitles instead.

Fedor Bondarchuk and Thomas Kretschmann have already starred in films with the name Stalingrad around the same time. Kretschmann played a Leutnant in the 1993 German film, and Bondarchuk was in the 1989 Russian film, which was directed by Yuri Ozerov.

Reception
Reception of the film was mixed. It was praised for stunning visuals, sound editing, music, and acting, but at the same time criticized for direction and melodramatic plot. According to Russian review aggregator Kritikanstvo.ru, its average critical score in Russian media is 63 out of 100. Such media as Rossiyskaya Gazeta, Vedomosti, Izvestia, Kommersant, and Expert were positive about the film. Several others, including Argumenty i Fakty, Ogoniok, and web publicist Dmitry Puchkov gave negative reviews. Some critics were disappointed by the film's plot on patriotic grounds: they felt it did not pay sufficient tribute to the heroes of the Stalingrad battle, but rather concentrated too much on the love story.

According to VTsIOM poll, Stalingrad was the most popular film of 2013 in Russia. 12% of respondents named it as "Film of the year", which is far above 4% for the runner-up, sport drama Legend № 17.

On American film aggregation website Rotten Tomatoes, it has a 51% rating, with an average score of 5.6/10, based on reviews from 69 critics. The site's consensus states: "There's no arguing with its impressive production values, but Stalingrad should have devoted more attention to the screenplay and spent less on special effects-enhanced spectacle." On another American aggregation website, Metacritic, the film has a 49/100 (citing "mixed or average reviews"), based on reviews from 23 critics.

Box office
In Russia, Stalingrad was a huge box office success earning a total of US$51,700,000, which set a new box office record for contemporary Russian films. It also set the record for opening weekend takings there, with a revenue of US$16,120,000. In the USA, the movie grossed just over US$1,000,000. Overall, the film earned over $68 million dollars worldwide.

It was the highest-grossing non-Hollywood, non-English language film in China until surpassed by India's PK in 2015.

See also
 Cinema of Russia
 List of submissions to the 86th Academy Awards for Best Foreign Language Film
 List of Russian submissions for the Academy Award for Best Foreign Language Film

References

External links
 
 

 
 Deserted "Stalingrad" movie set

2013 films
2013 3D films
2013 war drama films
Russian historical adventure films
Russian 3D films
Historical action films
Russian war drama films
2010s Russian-language films
2010s German-language films
Films directed by Fedor Bondarchuk
Films scored by Angelo Badalamenti
IMAX films
Films about the Battle of Stalingrad
Siege films
World War II films based on actual events
Eastern Front of World War II films
Films set in 1942
Films set in 2011
Films set in Russia
Films set in the Soviet Union
Films shot in Saint Petersburg
2013 drama films
Russian World War II films